Taking the Count is an 1898 painting by American artist Thomas Eakins. It is part of the collection of the Yale University Art Gallery.

This depiction of a prizefight marks Eakins' return to anatomical studies of the male figure, this time in a more urban setting. Taking the Count was his second largest canvas, but not his most successful composition. The same may be said of his Wrestlers (1899). More successful was Between Rounds (1899), for which boxer Billy Smith posed seated in his corner at Philadelphia's Arena; in fact, all of principal figures in this composition were posed by models re-enacting what had been an actual boxing match.

See also
 1898 in art

References

1898 paintings
Boxing in art
Paintings by Thomas Eakins
Sports paintings